Paul Méfano (March 6, 1937 – September 15, 2020), was a French composer and conductor.

Biography
Paul Méfano was born in Basra, Iraq. He pursued musical studies at the École Normale de Musique de Paris, and then later at the Paris Conservatory (CNSMP), where he was a student of Andrée Vaurabourg-Honegger, Darius Milhaud, and Georges Dandelot. He completed his studies in Basel at the courses taught by Pierre Boulez, Karlheinz Stockhausen, and Henri Pousseur.

He regularly attended the concerts of the Domaine Musical, as well as the seminars at Darmstadt, and enrolled in Olivier Messiaen's class at the CNSMP. Messiaen described Méfano as "restless, intense, and always in search of radical solutions".

In 1965 his music was performed publicly for the first time, at the Domaine Musical under the baton of Bruno Maderna. From 1966 to 1968 he lived in the United States, and then in 1969 he moved to Berlin at the invitation of the German Academic Exchange Service (DAAD).

In 1970 he returned to France, signed a contract with Salabert, and devoted himself to composition, to conducting, and to musical life in general. In 1972 he founded the Ensemble 2e2m, a group which he regularly conducted, and with which he has premièred more than five hundred works by young composers and with which he has made more than forty recordings. He is the founder of the Editions du Mordant for the publication of contemporary music, and of the Editions Musicales Européennes (dedicated primarily to young composers), and he has produced a number of notable radio series.

In 1972 he was appointed director of the Conservatory of Champigny-sur-Marne, a duty which he performed until 1988. He also was professor of composition and orchestration at the Paris Conservatory until 2002. One of his conducting students was the Canadian composer Claude Vivier.

From 1996 until 2005 he directed the Conservatory of Versailles.

The most important works of Paul Méfano are published and accessible at Babelscores.

In 2007, Paul Méfano became the director of the CLSI ensemble (Circle for the Liberation of Sounds & Images) with various musicians and composers like Gérard Pape, Jacqueline Méfano, Olga Krashenko, Lissa Meridan, Michael Kinney, Martin Phelps, Rodolphe Bourotte, Stefan Tiedje, Jean-Baptiste Favory.

Musical style

Méfano's compositional style has evolved considerably from his early serial work Incidences (1960) down to recent compositions which make extensive use of microtones, such as Speed (2000). His early serial style is clearly under the influence of Boulez, but the ardour of his employment of these traits "confounds the crystalline, the mirror-like and with it all suggestion of musical geometry".. He has an essentially poetic conception of music, reflected in a lifelong interest in poets and poetry. This is manifested especially in his treatment of instrumental color and in his vocal writing. He also has a special feeling for drama, as manifested in La cérémonie. At the beginning of the 1970s he experimented with electronics (La messe des voleurs), and with its real-time combination with instruments. Though he has shown interest in the music of the spectralist composers, his own compositions are not at all similar, and today he is regarded as a "post-spectralist" composer. Many of his works explore and develop contemporary techniques for the flute, such as in Captive, Eventails, Gradiva, Traits suspendus, or Ensevelie. His earliest works (Trois chants crépusculaires) maintain links with tonality, to which he returned in Micromégas. Since this work he has remained faithful to serial technique.

Awards
He has been awarded the following prizes and honors:
 1971 – Prix Enesco de SACEM.
 1980 – Chevalier de l'Ordre du Mérite.
 1982 – Grand prix national de la Musique.
 1985 – Commandeur de l'Ordre des Arts et Lettres.
 1989 – Prix SACEM de la musique symphonique.

Catalog of works

Discography

References

Sources

Further reading
 Hirsbrunner, Théo. 2001. "L'intelligibilité du texte poétique dans la composition musicale", in Littérature et musique dans la France contemporaine: actes du colloque des 20–22 mars 1999 en Sorbonne, edited by Jean-Louis Backès, Claude Coste, and Danièle Pistone, 101–107. Strasbourg: Presses Universitaires de Strasbourg, 2001. .

External links
 
 

1937 births
2020 deaths
People from Basra
French classical composers
French male classical composers
20th-century classical composers
21st-century classical composers
French male conductors (music)
Conservatoire de Paris alumni
Academic staff of the Conservatoire de Paris
École Normale de Musique de Paris alumni
Knights of the Ordre national du Mérite
Commandeurs of the Ordre des Arts et des Lettres
Pupils of Darius Milhaud
Pupils of Karlheinz Stockhausen
20th-century French conductors (music)
20th-century French male musicians
21st-century French conductors (music)
21st-century French male musicians